Walter George Seabrook (12 February 1904 – 13 June 1988) was an English cricketer.  Seabrook was a left-handed batsman who bowled left-arm fast-medium. He was born in Brockworth, Gloucestershire and was educated at Haileybury, where he represented the college cricket team.

Seabrook made his only first-class appearance for Gloucestershire against Kent in the 1928 County Championship.  In this match he was dismissed for a duck twice, while with the ball he bowled 2 wicket-less overs.  The following year he married Margaret Joan Spens, the couple would go on to have three children.  Seabrook later served in World War II, by December 1944 he held the rank of 2nd Lieutenant in the Gloucestershire Regiment.  On 30 May 1945, Seabrook relinquished his commission and left the army.  He later died in Bourne End, Buckinghamshire on 13 June 1988.

His brother-in-law, Archibald Spens, played a single first-class match for the Europeans in the British Raj, while his brother, Frederick, played first-class cricket for Gloucestershire and Cambridge University.

References

External links
Walter Seabrook at ESPNcricinfo
Walter Seabrook at CricketArchive

1904 births
1988 deaths
People from Brockworth, Gloucestershire
People educated at Haileybury and Imperial Service College
English cricketers
Gloucestershire cricketers
British Army personnel of World War II
Gloucestershire Regiment officers
Sportspeople from Gloucestershire